Every Time You Say Goodbye is the second album by the American bluegrass band Alison Krauss & Union Station, released in 1992. It reached number 75 on the Billboard Country Albums chart.

At the 35th Grammy Awards ceremony held in 1993, Every Time You Say Goodbye won the Grammy Award for Best Bluegrass Album.

Track listing
 "Every Time You Say Goodbye" (John Pennell) – 3:13
 "Another Night" (Jack Adkins) – 2:56
 "Last Love Letter" (Sidney Cox) – 3:04
 "Cluck Old Hen" (Traditional) – 2:30
 "Who Can Blame You" (Ron Block) – 3:17
 "It Won't Work This Time" (Aubrey Holt) – 2:59
 "Heartstrings" (Marshall Wilborn) – 3:30
 "I Don't Know Why" (Shawn Colvin) – 2:43
 "Cloudy Days" (Billy Ray Reynolds) – 3:26
 "New Fool" (Sidney Cox) – 2:47
 "Shield of Faith" (Ron Block) – 2:34
 "Lose Again" (Karla Bonoff) – 2:50
 "Another Day, Another Dollar" (Dan Tyminski) – 2:29
 "Jesus Help Me to Stand" (Ron Block) – 3:50

Personnel
 Alison Krauss – fiddle, vocals
 Ron Block – banjo, vocals
 Barry Bales – bass, vocals
 Tim Stafford – guitar, vocals
 Adam Steffey – mandolin, vocals

Chart performance

References

1992 albums
Alison Krauss & Union Station albums
Rounder Records albums
Grammy Award for Best Bluegrass Album